Grayson and Ould was the title of an architectural practice based in Liverpool, Merseyside, England.  George Enoch Grayson (1833/4–1912) (usually known as G. E. Grayson) established an independent practice in Liverpool in 1857.  Edward Ould (1852–1909) trained with John Douglas in Chester.  The partnership was formed in 1886; prior to this each designed buildings separately.  After 1886 most of the works were designed together, with some exceptions shown in the list.  Grayson's son, George Hastwell Grayson (1871–1951), joined the partnership in 1896.

In the list below, buildings designed by Grayson alone are denoted by † in the "Name" column, and Ould's designs by *.

Key

Works

References

Bibliography

 

Grayson and Ould